Stegny is a neighbourhood in the Mokotów district of Warsaw.

Stegny may also refer to the following villages in Poland:
Stegny, Kuyavian-Pomeranian Voivodeship
Stegny, Warmian-Masurian Voivodeship